Fortress Pass is a mountain pass that crosses the Canadian Rockies south of Jasper.  At , Fortress Pass is (along with Monkman Pass) one of the lowest passes to cross the Canadian Rockies that is not traversed by a road.  Not only is Fortress Pass low, it is also relatively gentle.  Between Fortress Lake to the west and Chaba River to the east there is almost no elevation difference.

Fortress Lake drains into the Columbia River via the Wood River, while Chaba River drains into the Mackenzie River via the Athabasca River.

Mountain passes of British Columbia
Canadian Rockies